Ng Sze Han (born 6 October 1971) is a Malaysian politician from the Democratic Action Party (DAP), a component party of the state ruling but federal opposition Pakatan Harapan (PH) coalition. He has served as Member of the Selangor State Executive Council (EXCO) in the PH state administration under Menteris Besar Azmin Ali and Amirudin Shari since May 2018 and Member of the Selangor State Legislative Assembly for Kinrara since May 2013. He has served as Assistant National Treasurer of DAP since March 2022 and is also the Treasurer of DAP of Selangor.

Election results

References 

Democratic Action Party (Malaysia) politicians
21st-century Malaysian politicians
Members of the Selangor State Legislative Assembly
Selangor state executive councillors
Living people
People from Batu Pahat
Malaysian people of Chinese descent
Trine University alumni
1971 births